Rao Shoukun (30 September 1915 – 14 September 2006) was a founding lieutenant general (zhongjiang) of the People's Liberation Army (PLA). He was a representative of the 11th and 12th National Congress of the Chinese Communist Party. He was a delegate to the 5th and 6th National People's Congress.

Biography
Rao was born into a peasant family in Dexing County (now Dexing), Jiangxi, on 30 September 1915. 

Under the influence of Fang Zhimin, he joined the Communist Youth League of China in June 1931. He enlisted in the Red Army in February 1932, and joined the Chinese Communist Party (CCP) in June 1933. During the Agrarian Revolutionary War, he fought guerrilla warfare with Kuomintang troops in both Jiangxi and Fujian provinces. During the Second Sino-Japanese War, he was given the position of a regimental commander, serving in the battlefields of Anhui.

After the establishment of the Communist State in 1949, he successively served as commander of the 7th Fleet of the Navy of the East China Military Region, commander of the Wusong Fortress, and commander of the Songhu Base. He attained the rank of lieutenant general (zhongjiang) in 1955. In October 1958, he was made deputy commander of the East China Sea Fleet of the People's Liberation Army Navy. In 1966, the Cultural Revolution broke out, he was discharged and suffered political persecution, and forced to work in Luoyang Diesel Engine Factory and then a factory of the Harbin Navy. He was reinstated as president of the Seventh Research Institute of the Ministry of Defense. In 1975, he was named commander of the North Sea Fleet, succeeding . In January 1980, he was promoted to become commander of Jinan Military Region, a position he held until June 1985. In 1985, he became a member of the Advisory Committee of the CPC Central Committee.

On 14 September 2006, he died in Jinan, Shandong, at the age of 90.

Publication

References

1915 births
2006 deaths
People from Dexing, Jiangxi
Counter-Japanese Military and Political University alumni
People's Liberation Army generals from Jiangxi
People's Republic of China politicians from Jiangxi
Chinese Communist Party politicians from Jiangxi
Commanders of the Jinan Military Region
Delegates to the 5th National People's Congress
Delegates to the 6th National People's Congress